Adam Viktora (born 6 September 1996) is a Seychellois Olympic swimmer. He represented his country at the 2016 Summer Olympics in the Men's 50 metre freestyle event where he ranked at #56 with a time of 24.30 seconds. He did not advance to the semifinals.

In 2014, he represented Seychelles at the 2014 Summer Youth Olympics held in Nanjing, China.

References

External links
 

1996 births
Living people
Czech male freestyle swimmers
Seychellois male freestyle swimmers
Swimmers at the 2016 Summer Olympics
Olympic swimmers of Seychelles
Swimmers at the 2014 Summer Youth Olympics